Proto.in is an Indian start-up event platform which had its first edition in January 2007. The platform was started by Chennai based not-for profit body The Knowledge Foundation with entrepreneur Vijay Anand as its curator and founder. The Knowledge Foundation is a not-for profit knowledge dissemination body which has had multiple events in Chennai including Blog Camp, Bar Camp, Wikicamp (inaugurated by Jimmy Wales) and Pod Works.

Since its first event in Jan 2007, Proto.in has had 8 editions across the cities of Chennai, New Delhi, Mumbai, Bangalore and Pune. 
The sole focus and objective of the event is to showcase 15 of the most innovative start-ups in the country and provide them with a platform in front of an audience of investors, entrepreneurs and customers alike. Proto was a key event in the India Startup Ecosystem TimeLine, bringing a critical mass of media, investors, customers, and technologists together for the first time.

Event Format

The event format is centered around the 'Showcase'. This is where 15 start-ups take the stage one by one and demo their products for 6 minutes each. The start-ups are generally slotted into categories - some of the popular ones in the previous editions of Proto.in have been Internet, Software, Mobile and Outliers which generally contains start-ups from a myriad set of sectors.

Event Locations

The event has been held in 7 different locations across the 5 cities of Chennai, New Delhi, Bangalore, Pune and Mumbai. It's always had a very strong link with the Academic community. The first 2 editions of Proto.in were held at IIT Madras. The 4th edition was held at IIT New Delhi, the 7th edition was held at IIT Bombay and the 8th edition was held at the Great Lakes Institute of Management in Chennai.

Nomination Process

The nomination process is one where a start-up needs to complete a nomination form that can be filled on the site. Start-ups are then evaluated on the basis of a broad set of criteria. The nomination panel is one which includes individuals from the field including start-up evangelists, entrepreneurs, Proto.in alumni and investors.

Support Partners

Proto.in has had a broadbase of knowledge partners, mentors and advisors. NASSCOM and TiE have been Knowledge Partners of Proto.in right from the platform's inception. The event has been supported and sponsored by a broad base of partners including the likes of Rediff.com, Microsoft, Google, Facebook, Airtel, Cisco and Sequoia Capital. Sequoia Capital has been the event platform's platinum sponsor for its last 2 editions.

Showcased start-ups

From the platform's inception, approximately 150 start-ups have showcased themselves at Proto.in over its last four years. Out of the total 150 start-ups that have showcased themselves at the event, research suggests that at least 35 have shut down or have merged to form another entity. 25 have raised funding of some form.

Team

Under the TKF Umbrella - Proto.in is currently headed by Sudhir Syal who is also the Editor and Co-Anchor of the Starting Up show on ET NOW, the most watched show on the start-up community in India. Sudhir previously managed the strategic alliances for Sulekha.com. Before the recently concluded Chennai edition (July 2011), the event was co-headed both by Sudhir and by IIT Madras Graduate Ravi Shankar. Both Sudhir and Ravi have been a part of the core founding team of Proto.in and have been closely involved with the growth of Proto.in. Sudhir has also been the anchor of the event for the last 4 editions and has headed the nomination panel for its last 3 editions.

Till the Bangalore edition of Proto.in (Jan 2009), the event was led by Vijay Anand. Till recently, Vijay Anand was the head of the RTBI incubator at IIT Madras. Today he runs the Startup Centre, a hub + accelerator for the Indian start-up community.

Most recently for the 8th edition of Proto.in Chennai. John Verbic, former Global Co-Head, ING Private Equity Group joined the core Proto.in team and served as Chief Mentor for the event.

Praise

Proto.in has been acknowledged as the best platform for start-ups in the country by a broad range of entrepreneurs and investor in the country ranging from Vishal Gondal, the founder of Indiagames.com to Naveen Tewari, the founder of global mobile advertising firm InMobi. In his keynote address at Proto.in Delhi in 2008, Kiran Karnik then Chairman of Nasscom referred to Proto.in as the Nasscom for product start-ups in the country. Proto.in has also played an active role in mentoring other start-up support organizations like Bar Camp and Open Coffee Club.

Criticism

In the past Proto.in has received criticism for backing only hi-tech product start-ups with a big focus only on web and social media. This perception has changed substantially over its last 3 editions with a deeper focus, they now have a more transparent nomination process. Over the last few editions the focus has also shifted to start-ups in categories like social enterprises, with a strong focus on technology enabled social enterprises.

There has also been criticism in terms of the Rs.10,000 nomination fee. Start-ups have found that it is a high price to pay, they also believe that there is a conflict when a start-up is first selected and then made to make a payment.

Proto.in's defence has always been the same - they would like to have a start-up to have skin in the game and take the event seriously. Unlike other events, Proto.in is the only one where start-ups are provided free boarding, lodging and a stall. In Proto.in's opinion, the actual cost it incurs per start-up is Rs.50,000.

References

Sources 
https://web.archive.org/web/20090905084422/http://www.proto.in/reach/faq/ *http://specials.rediff.com/money/2007/jan/19proto.htm
http://www.moneycontrol.com/india/news/pressnews/the-next-google-could-be-you/284457
https://web.archive.org/web/20090129024802/http://www.efytimes.com/efytimes/fullnews.asp?edid=19388
http://www.thehindubusinessline.com/2007/06/07/stories/2007060702210400.htm
http://www.livemint.com/2007/07/22181826/23-hopeful-startups-make-the.html
http://www.thehindubusinessline.com/2008/01/15/stories/2008011552370400.htm
http://www.newswiretoday.com/news/36315/
http://www.rediff.com/getahead/slide-show/slide-show-1-career-are-these-the-hottest-15-indian-startups/20110713.htm
https://web.archive.org/web/20110930045239/http://www.vccircle.com/500/content/protoin-showcases-startups-to-vcs
https://web.archive.org/web/20120319042713/http://apnnews.com/2011/07/12/proto-in-to-showcase-15-of-indias-hottest-start-ups/
https://web.archive.org/web/20120328091726/http://godinchief.instablogs.com/entry/startups-rock-at-protoin-should-techcrunch50-demo-look-at-india/

External links
 

Entrepreneurship organizations
Indian websites